Julien Chauvin (born 17 April 1975) is a French former professional tennis player.

Chauvin played collegiate tennis for the University of Mobile in Alabama, then competed on the professional tour during the late 1990s, reaching a best singles world ranking of 184. He made the third and final qualifying round for the 1997 French Open, with wins over Mark Knowles and Joan Balcells (retired hurt). His only ATP Tour main draw appearance came at the 1997 Marbella Open, where he lost in the first round to seventh seed Julián Alonso.

References

External links
 
 

1975 births
Living people
French male tennis players
Mobile Rams athletes
College men's tennis players in the United States